Barton Rubenstein (born 1962) is a modernist American sculptor. Rubenstein has focused most of his artistic efforts on themes related to water and kinetics. He lives in Maryland with his wife and three kids.

Early life
His mother, Daryl Reich Rubenstein, was an art historian and curator at the Smithsonian institution. Rubenstein grew up in Washington, DC, attending Sidwell Friends School. He spent much of his childhood visiting museums in the United States and Europe. Led by his father, Lee Rubenstein, the family gained a reputation for creating large snow sculptures. Rubenstein spent much of his childhood creating projects with his hands, such as motorized go-carts. He also enjoyed sailing and canoeing, which he continues to this day. This has had a powering impact on  his art.

Scientific career

He went to Haverford College, Pennsylvania, where he received a BSc in physics (1985) and a minor in art. At the time, Rubenstein had aspirations to be a scientist and received a full scholarship to attend the Weizmann Institute of Science, Israel. He first obtained a MSc in Mathematics and Computer Science (1990). He then continued with his doctoral studies, culminating in a PhD in neuroscience (1994). During his time at the Weizmann Institute, his research focused on the visual brain. With his advisor, Professor Dov Sagi, he was able to resolve a 30-year-old scientific dilemma, which tried to understand how the human visual system is able to effortlessly discriminate between different types of visual textures, such as tree bark. They published their findings in the Optical Society of America (1990). Another accomplishment of his laboratory was elucidating the learning process in the brain. It was determined that after practicing a visual task, a consolidation period of at least six hours was needed before any improvement occurs. The expressions, "cramming before a test will not be of any benefit" and "sleeping on it" are adages that are supported by this research. To further this research, Rubenstein and colleagues wondered whether a certain stage of sleep was responsible for this consolidation. Their findings, reported in the Journal of Science (1994), show conclusively that the consolidation of visually learned tasks occurs during the dream stage (REM). These findings began a resurgence in the study of sleep. Rubenstein and colleagues's research has been further cited and discussed in various publications, including Scientific American and the New York Times.

Sculpture

With the possibility of a post doctorate position at the National Institutes of Health (NIH), Rubenstein instead deferred for a year to begin creating metal sculpture. He enrolled at the Corcoran College of Art and Design for a semester to learn the techniques of welding, mold making, and the lost wax process. He created a body of sculptures incorporating water. These water sculptures launched him into the art world (1994), beginning a cascade of exhibitions and commissions in the United States and internationally. His work, primarily of stainless steel and bronze, is human scale and monumental in size. One of his works, Ray of Light, won an arts competition in Redwood City, California and also serves as a bird bath.

In addition to his water sculptures, Rubenstein also creates wind kinetic sculpture. These sculptures use a novel design, invented by the artist, which creates a slow back-and-forth movement in his art. This movement has a dance-like quality and has been likened to the waltz. Rubenstein also creates what he calls "sculpture in suspension," which juxtaposes sculptural elements so they appear to be swooping across space and "ignoring gravity."

Among the modernist sculptors who have influenced Rubenstein are George Rickey and Henry Moore.

Mother Earth Project
In 2015, Rubenstein with his family began the Mother Earth Project, MEP, a global environment-saving initiative. This project activates sustainability worldwide engaging communities to create Parachutes For The Planet®, 12' diameter play parachutes that are decorated with artwork and a community's next sustainable actions. They display these parachutes locally, strike with them, and then take them to their local politicians to demand better climate laws. As of 2020, thousands of parachutes have been distributed to over 70 countries, many of them documented on the MEP social media platform and on its website (Instagram @MotherEarthProject). Also, to acknowledge a country's efforts to be more sustainable and follow the 2015 Paris Agreement, MEP is placing the “Mother Earth” sculpture in cities worldwide. This sculpture is the footprint of the project and is the Symbol of Sustainability. MEP had its inaugural Mother Earth sculpture dedication on April, 2017 in Washington, DC and there is now a Mother Earth sculpture in China, Israel, Cameroon, Germany, Argentina, and India, covering five continents.

Honors and awards
 2016 Distinguished Alumni Award, Sidwell Friends School, Washington, DC
 2013 Creativity Award, Moment Magazine, Washington, DC
 Rubenstein has been awarded numerous commissions as the result of national competitions. These projects range from academic institutions, hospitals, libraries, banks, veteran homes, and state projects.
 2010  Rubenstein received an official citation from the Maryland General Assembly for his contribution to public art.
 2005  Rubenstein served as member of a committee at the National Academies to design the next generation US currency. The redesigned $100 bill is the result of design change recommendations made by this committee.

References

 Beth Parker, "MD Scientist Turned Artist Leaves Mark," Fox 5 News, Washington, DC, Feb 1, 2010.
 Dave Munday, "The Ripple Effects of Life in Art," The Post and Courier, SC, March 14, 2004.

External links
 Rubenstein Studios
 Mother Earth Project

20th-century American sculptors
Modern sculptors
Living people
1962 births
Artists from Washington, D.C.
Sidwell Friends School alumni
Haverford College alumni
21st-century American sculptors